SS Kiangya or Jiangya (Chinese: t , s , p Jiāngyà Lún) was a Chinese passenger steamship that was destroyed in an explosion near the mouth of the Huangpu River  north of Shanghai on 3 or 4 December 1948. Her wreck was cleared from the channel in 1956 and her hull refurbished, re-entering service.

She had a displacement of 2,100 tons. At the time of her explosion during the Chinese Civil War, she was bound for Ningpo from Shanghai's Shiliupu Dock. She was packed with refugees fleeing the advancing Communists. She probably hit a mine, possibly laid by the Imperial Japanese Navy during the Second World War. The exact death toll is unknown. Although her official capacity was 1,186 passengers, the manifest listed 2,150 and she was almost certainly carrying many additional stowaways. Rescuers were unaware of the disaster for some hours. With an estimated death toll of between 2,750 and 3,920 people, with 700 survivors being picked up by other vessels, it remains the second deadliest peacetime maritime disaster in history.

SS Dongfang Hong 8

The hull of the Kiangya had broken in half but, in 1956, the two pieces were removed in order to dredge that area of the river. The process took 160 days, after which the pieces were moved to the Jiangnan Shipyard and refurbished. She re-entered service at Shanghai's Shiliupu Dock on 4 February 1959, after which she served as a local ferry and for shipping between Shanghai and Wuhan. She was renamed the Dongfang Hong 8 in November 1966 during the Cultural Revolution. She was retired in 1983. During shipbreaking operations in June 2000, a major oil fire broke out.

Legacy

The ship's wooden steering wheel is preserved at the East Zhejiang Maritime Affairs and Folk Customs Museum in Ningbo.

The ship gave her name to Jiangya Nansha, one of the component shoals of Jiuduansha off eastern Shanghai.

See also
 List of maritime disasters

Footnotes

References

External links

Steamships
Maritime incidents in 1948
1948 in China
Shipwrecks in rivers
Ships of China
Ships sunk by mines
Shipwrecks in the East China Sea
Maritime incidents in China
Shipwrecks of China